Nixon Perea (born August 15, 1973) is a Colombian football player. He has played for LD Alajuelense (Costa Rica), Independiente Santa Fe (Colombia), Atlético Nacional (Colombia),  and Vegalta Sendai (Japan). He played for the Colombia national team at 1993 FIFA World Youth Championship in Australia.

Club statistics

References

External links

1973 births
Living people
Colombian footballers
Colombian expatriate footballers
Colombia under-20 international footballers
Independiente Santa Fe footballers
Atlético Nacional footballers
Vegalta Sendai players
L.D. Alajuelense footballers
Liga FPD players
J2 League players
Expatriate footballers in Japan
Expatriate footballers in Costa Rica
Association football midfielders
Footballers from Barranquilla